The city of Dallas and the Dallas metropolitan division is home to teams in six major sports: the Dallas Cowboys (National Football League), Dallas Mavericks (National Basketball Association), Texas Rangers (Major League Baseball), Dallas Stars (National Hockey League), FC Dallas (Major League Soccer) and Dallas Wings (Women's National Basketball Association).

Dallas area major college sports programs include Patriots baseball of Dallas Baptist University located in southwest Dallas, and the Mustangs of Southern Methodist University, located in the enclave of University Park. Neighboring cities Fort Worth, Arlington, and Denton are home to the Texas Christian University Horned Frogs, University of Texas at Arlington Mavericks, and University of North Texas Mean Green, respectively.

Major league teams

American football
Nearby Arlington, Texas, is home to the Dallas Cowboys of the National Football League. Since joining the league as an expansion team in 1960, the Cowboys have enjoyed substantial success, advancing to eight Super Bowls and winning five. Known widely as "America's Team", the Dallas Cowboys are financially the most valuable sports franchise in the United States, worth approximately 2.3 billion dollars. They are also the most valuable sports organization in the world. From 1960-71, the Cowboys played home games at the Cotton Bowl, in Dallas's Fair Park. From 1971-2008, the team played at Texas Stadium in Irving, Texas. In 2009, the Cowboys relocated to their new 80,000-seat AT&T Stadium in Arlington, which was the site of Super Bowl XLV. The college Cotton Bowl Classic football game was played at the Cotton Bowl through its 2009 game, but has moved to AT&T Stadium.

Indoor football

Nearby Frisco, Texas, is home to the Frisco Fighters of the Indoor Football League. The team was founded in 2021, and plays its home games at the Comerica Center in Frisco. The season is played from May to August. The league was formed in 2008 with 19 teams competing currently they have 12 teams playing with 5 more teams joining in 2022.

Men's basketball
Downtown Dallas is home to the Dallas Mavericks. Their original arena was the now demolished Reunion Arena, but now they play at the American Airlines Center. The Mavericks have won one championship, winning the 2011 NBA Finals, led by German-born superstar Dirk Nowitzki. The Mavericks have enjoyed having one of the largest fanbases in the NBA, consistently ranking in the top 5 over the last few years in attendance. The Mavericks had a streak of 12 consecutive playoff appearances from 2001-2012 and 15 appearances in 16 years from 2001-2016, only missing the playoffs in 2013 when they finished with an even 41–41 record and out of the playoffs as the 10th seed.

NBA G League

The Mavericks' minor league affiliate, the Texas Legends, play in Frisco, Texas, and compete in the NBA G League. The franchise began as the Colorado 49ers in 2006, and moved to Frisco in 2009. The Legends play their home games at the Comerica Center in Frisco.

Women's basketball
The Dallas Wings of the WNBA play home games at the College Park Center on the campus of University of Texas at Arlington. The franchise relocated to the North Texas market in 2015 from Tulsa, Oklahoma, where they were known as the Tulsa Shock.

Baseball
The Texas Rangers of Major League Baseball also play home games in Arlington, at the new Globe Life Field. home of the 2010 and 2011 American League Champion Texas Rangers of Major League Baseball. The franchise was established in 1961 as the Washington Senators, and moved to Arlington after the 1971 season, becoming the Rangers in 1972. From 1972-1993, the team played home games at Arlington Stadium. From 1994-2019, the Rangers played home games at a stadium originally known as The Ballpark in Arlington; the stadium is currently known as Choctaw Stadium. Beginning in 2020, the team played its home games at Globe Life Field in Arlington. The Rangers most successful seasons were 2010 and 2011, as they won the American League Championship and competed in the World Series in both years.

Minor League Baseball

The Rangers' Minor League Baseball (AA-Affiliate) Frisco RoughRiders play in Frisco, Texas. The team was founded in 2003, and plays its home games at Riders Field (formerly known as Dr. Pepper Ballpark).

Soccer (association football)
The Major League Soccer team FC Dallas, formerly the Dallas Burn, currently play at Toyota Stadium in Frisco. The team originally played at the Cotton Bowl in Dallas, spent one year playing at a high school stadium in Southlake, Texas (Dragon Stadium), and began playing in Frisco in 2005. FC Dallas also has an affiliate team in the developmental MLS Next league, called North Texas SC. NTSC plays most home games at Choctaw Stadium in Arlington.

Indoor soccer

Dallas has been home to two different franchises known as the Dallas Sidekicks. From 1984-2004, the original Dallas Sidekicks played in the Major Indoor Soccer League, hosting home games at Reunion Arena.  After the league fell apart, and after an eight year hiatus, in 2012 another version of the Dallas Sidekicks was formed. This current version of the Sidekicks plays in the Major Arena Soccer League, hosting home games at the Credit Union of Texas Event Center in Allen, Texas.

2026 FIFA World Cup

AT&T Stadium will host several matches during the 2026 FIFA World Cup.

Ice hockey

The Dallas Stars of  the National Hockey League have played in Dallas since 1993. The franchise originated in 1967 in Minneapolis, Minnesota, as the Minnesota North Stars, and moved to Dallas after the 1992-93 season. The team plays its home games at the American Airlines Center, after playing originally at Reunion Arena.The Stars won the Stanley Cup in 1999, plus the Western Conference championship three times, two Presidents' Trophies as the top regular season team in the NHL, and eight division titles.  The team helped popularize hockey in the region, with Valley Ranch in Irving going from just one sheet of ice when the Stars arrived in 1993 to almost 30 in 2010.

Lower levels of hockey

The Allen Americans, founded for the 2009–10 season, play in the Central Division of the ECHL. Their home arena is the Credit Union of Texas Event Center located in Allen, Texas, approximately 30 minutes northeast of Dallas. The junior hockey Lone Star Brahmas (formerly the five-time defending champions Texas Tornado) of the North American Hockey League play at the NYTEX Sports Centre in North Richland Hills.

Lacrosse
Fort Worth, Texas, is home to Panther City Lacrosse, a box lacrosse team in the National Lacrosse League. The team began in the 2021-22 season, and plays its home games at Dickies Arena.

Rugby Union
The Dallas Jackals of Major League Rugby are the first professional rugby team in DFW. The team was announced on June 5, 2020, and began play in February 2022. The team plays home games at Choctaw Stadium in Arlington.

Rugby union is a developing sport in Dallas as well as the whole of Texas. The multiple clubs, ranging from men's and women's clubs to collegiate and high school, are part of the Texas Rugby Football Union. Currently Dallas is one of only 16 cities in the United States included in the Rugby Super League represented by Dallas Harlequins.

List of current major league teams
Major league sports teams currently playing in the Dallas–Fort Worth area:

List of current minor league teams
Minor league sports teams currently playing in the Dallas–Fort Worth area:

Other sports

Roller Derby 
The Dallas Derby Devils were founded in November 2004 and are the original North Texas roller derby league with a current roster of over one hundred active skaters. Dallas Derby Devils is one of the largest flat track derby leagues in the southern United States. The Dallas Derby Devils are an original member of the Women's Flat Track Derby Association (WFTDA). Game have been held at NYTEX Sports Centre in North Richland Hills since 2008. In 2019, the Dallas Derby Devils integrated the Rolling Rebellion, a Junior Roller Derby Association (JRDA) team, into their ranks expanding the program to include all youth ages 7-17 years of age.  The league currently holds a full home season schedule in addition to their annual Clover Cup Tournament.

Cricket
In 2021, USA Cricket announced it would be moving its headquarters to Grand Prairie, at the stadium formerly known as AirHogs Stadium. Cricket is popular among diaspora from South Asian countries. Local universities such as SMU, University of Texas at Arlington and University of Texas at Dallas have their own cricket clubs that are affiliated with USA Cricket.

Call of Duty
The Dallas Empire competes in the Call of Duty League, also known as, CDL. The Empire are one of the 12 inaugural teams in the Call of Duty League. During the first season of the CDL, the Dallas Empire defeated Atlanta FaZe 5-1 to capture the CDL's first-ever league championship. Call of Duty Esports legend, Crimsix took the Call of Duty Championship Finals MVP. Dallas Empire is owned by Team Envy.

Horse racing
About halfway between Dallas and Fort Worth, horse-racing takes place at Lone Star Park in Grand Prairie.

Ultimate Frisbee
The Dallas Legion, formerly the Dallas Roughnecks, compete in the American Ultimate Disc League (AUDL). The Legion's home field is the John Paul II High School Stadium in Plano, Texas. The team played its first season in 2016, finishing 17–0 and was crowned the AUDL Champions in its inaugural season. The Roughnecks are the only team to compete in Championship Weekend (Final 4) each of the last 4 seasons (and the only team to finish in the top 4 every season in its history).

Overwatch
The Dallas Fuel competes in the Overwatch League. The Fuel were one of the league's 12 founding teams. During the inaugural season the fuel finished 10th overall with a record of 12 wins and 28 losses.
The Fuel won their first OWL championship in the 2022 season after defeating the San Francisco Shock in the 2022 Grand Finals.

Other sports
The Dallas Diamonds, the two-time national champions of the Women's Professional Football League, play in North Richland Hills. McKinney is home to the Dallas Revolution, an Independent Women's Football League team. The Dallas Bluestorm was a charter of the United National Gridiron League, a proposed minor football league that had planned to begin play in 2010.

As reported by Olympic news outlet Around the Rings, Dallas was looking at a 2020 Summer Olympics bid. Those in favor of Dallas said that it should be chosen because no major stadiums would have to be built for the games.

Former sports teams

American football 
National Football League

In 1952, an NFL franchise called the Dallas Texans (NFL) played for one season. The team went 1-11 and folded after one season.

In 1960, Dallas millionaire Lamar Hunt founded the American Football League, and located his team in Dallas, naming them the Dallas Texans. The Dallas Texans won one AFL Championship in 1962. And after playing three seasons in Dallas, the team relocated in 1963 to become the Kansas City Chiefs.

XFL

The Dallas Renegades were members of the XFL and played their home games at the Globe Life Park in Arlington. until the XFL’s shutdown in the middle of the 2020 season. The XFL has announced its intention to re-launch in 2023.

Arena football

Dallas has hosted three arena football franchises in its past, all a part of the now-defunct Arena Football League. From 1990-1993, the Dallas Texans (Arena) competed in the league, calling Reunion Arena their home. From 2002-2008, the AFL team was the Dallas Desperados, playing home games at the American Airlines Center. In 2010-2011, the Dallas Vigilantes played in the American Airlines Center as a part of the restructured Arena Football League.

Baseball 
The Fort Worth Cats were a historic minor-league baseball team that played from 1888-1964. Through its history, the team was affiliated with a variety of Major League franchises.

The Texas AirHogs were an independent professional baseball team located in Grand Prairie, Texas from 2008-2020.

Soccer (association football) 
The Dallas Tornado were a professional soccer team in the North American Soccer League from 1968 to 1981. The team and the league were founded by Dallas sports legend Lamar Hunt. The Tornado won the 1971 NASL championship.

Lacrosse
The Dallas Rattlers of Major League Lacrosse became the first professional lacrosse team to call the state of Texas home in November 2017 when the league announced its franchise from Rochester, New York would be relocating to Frisco and The Ford Center at The Star. The Rattlers were one of the six founding members of Major League Lacrosse. The league merged with the Premier Lacrosse League in 2020, and the Rattlers ceased to exist.

Former teams by table 
Sports teams that formerly played in the Dallas-Fort Worth area:

Collegiate sports
Dallas has no major Division I college sports program within its political boundaries, although it has one program within its city limits—the Mustangs of Southern Methodist University are located in the enclave of University Park. The only Division I team that plays within the political boundaries of Dallas is the baseball program of Dallas Baptist University (Patriots), which plays in Division I despite otherwise being a Division II member. Neighboring cities Fort Worth, Arlington, and Denton are home to the Texas Christian University Horned Frogs, University of Texas at Arlington Mavericks, and University of North Texas Mean Green respectively.

Toyota Stadium in Frisco has hosted the NCAA Division I Football Championship, the title game of the second-tier Division I FCS, since the 2010 season, and will continue to host this event through at least the 2024 season.

Recreation

Its flagship park is the  Fair Park, which hosted the Texas Centennial Exposition in 1936. The city is also home to Texas' first and largest zoo, the  Dallas Zoo, which opened at its current location in 1888.

The Trinity River Audubon Center is a new addition to the park. Opened in 2008, it serves as a gateway to many trails and other nature viewing activities in the area. The Trinity River Audubon Center is the first LEED-certified building constructed by the City of Dallas Parks and Recreation Department.

Dallas also hosts three of the twenty-one preserves of the extensive Dallas County Preserve System. Both the Joppa Preserve, the McCommas Bluff Preserve the Cedar Ridge Preserve are all within the Dallas city limits. The Cedar Ridge Preserve was formerly known as the Dallas Nature Center, but management was turned over to Audubon Dallas group, which now manages the  natural habitat park on behalf of the city of Dallas and Dallas County.

Just southwest of Dallas is Cedar Hill State Park, maintained by the Texas Parks and Wildlife state agency. A  urban nature preserve, the park is located on the  Joe Pool Reservoir, and offers activities such as mountain biking, birding, camping and fishing; swimming is allowed at the swimming beach only.

To the west of Dallas in Arlington is Six Flags Over Texas, the original franchise in the Six Flags theme park chain. Hurricane Harbor, a large water park owned by Six Flags, is also in Arlington.

References